The Ansaldo A.300 was an Italian general-purpose biplane aircraft built by the Ansaldo company (now part of FIAT) of Turin from 1920 to 1929.  It also served as a light bomber, transport, fighter and reconnaissance aircraft, and finally as an advanced trainer, with examples in service as late as 1940. 50 examples were also license-built in Poland at ZM E. Plage & T. Laśkiewicz, but were not a success due to poor quality.

Development
Based on Ansaldo's highly successful World War I Balilla and S.V.A scouts, the A.300 was a conventional single-engined two-bay open cockpit biplane of mixed metal and wood-and-fabric construction, powered usually by a water-cooled Fiat A.12bis V12 engine.  Most variants had two fixed Vickers guns and one mobile gun mounted in the rear cockpit. It first flew in 1919.

Early examples were two seaters, but the A.300/3 was a three-seater intended for reconnaissance use, of which around 90 were delivered.  The  most significant variant was the A.300/4, again mostly three-seaters, which started full production in 1923, just as Ansaldo was absorbed into FIAT.  This became the standard multi-role aircraft in the newly formed Regia Aeronautica and served in Italy, Sicily, Sardinia, Corfu, Libya and Eritrea.

Operational history
The A.300 was one of the most numerous aircraft of its time, with the production run of the A.300/4 alone, at 700 units, exceeding the total production of any other type of the 1920s except the Breguet XIX and Potez 25.  Despite this, and possibly because it was Italian rather than French or British, it remains one of the least documented contemporary types, certainly the most obscure produced in anything like these numbers.

Variants
A.300/2initial production version
A.300/3three-seat version, also exported to Spain, Belgium, and Poland
A.300/4definitive production version with improved cooling
A.300/5prototype with Lorraine engine
A.300/6improved A.300/4, also in service
A.300C Four passenger airliner. Several built 1921-'26 and operated by the Belgian airline SNETA, French airlines SABENA and 1925 operated by the Romanian airlines SNNA, as regular flights with 5 aircraft.
A.300T Eight passenger airliner. At least one built 1921.
A.400prototype

Operators

Belgian Air Force

Corpo Aeronautico Militare

Polish Air Force

Soviet Air Force

Türk Hava Kurumu (THK)

Specifications (A.300/4)

Notes

Bibliography

 
 
 
 
  (p. 53 for 300/3, p. 55 for 300C)

Ansaldo A.300
Biplanes
Single-engined tractor aircraft
1910s Italian military reconnaissance aircraft
Aircraft first flown in 1919